The 1984 Virginia Tech Hokies football team represented the Virginia Polytechnic Institute and State University (Virginia Tech) in the 1984 NCAA Division I-A football season as a Division I-A Independent. The team was led by head coach Bill Dooley, in his seventh year, and played their home games at Lane Stadium in Blacksburg, Virginia. They finished the season with a record of eight wins and four losses (8–4), and with a loss against Air Force in the Independence Bowl. Bruce Smith won the Outland Trophy and was the first pick overall in the 1985 NFL Draft.

Schedule

Roster

Team players in the NFL
The following players were drafted in the 1985 NFL Draft.

Source:

Awards and honors
Bruce Smith, Outland Trophy
Bruce Smith, Consensus All-American

References

Virginia Tech
Virginia Tech Hokies football seasons
Virginia Tech Hokies football